This a list of Asean Basketball League team rosters for the inaugural season (2009-2010).

This list denotes the entire roster fielded in by ABL teams for the duration of the inaugural season.  Flags denote the player's place of birth.

Brunei Barracudas

Kuala Lumpur Dragons

Philippine Patriots

Satria Muda BritAma

Singapore Slingers

Thailand Tigers

Notes

External links
 Asean Basketball League official site

team rosters